The 2003–04 VfL Osnabrück season is the club's 105th season in existence and the first season back in the top flight of German football. In addition to the domestic league, VfL Osnabrück will participate in this season's edition of the DFB-Pokal. The season covers the period from 1 July 2003 to 30 June 2004.

Transfers

In

Out

Pre-season and friendlies

Competitions

Overview

2. Bundesliga

League table

Results summary

Results by round

Matches

DFB-Pokal

Statistics

Goalscorers

References

VfL Osnabrück seasons
VfL Osnabrück